Lochmaeocles zonatus is a species of beetle in the family Cerambycidae. It was described by Dillon and Dillon in 1946. It is known from Guyana, Trinidad and Tobago, and French Guiana.

References

zonatus
Beetles described in 1946